Jimmi is a given name. Notable people with the name include:

Dr Jimmi Clay, fictional character in the soap opera Doctors
Jimmi Bredahl (born 1967), Danish boxer in the super featherweight division
Jimmi Harkishin (born 1965), British actor best known for his role as shop owner Dev Alahan in Coronation Street
Jimmi Klitland (born 1982), Danish football player
Jimmi Seiter (born 1945), American musician, percussionist, tour manager, artist manager, music producer, sound designer, stage producer and architect
Jimmi Simpson (born 1975), American actor

See also 

 Jimmy (disambiguation)
 Jimmie
 Jimi

da:Jimmi
de:Jimmi